In 2012, the Hull Kingston Rovers competed in the 17th season of the Super League and also in the 2012 Challenge Cup. Last season they finished in the top eight before losing in the playoffs.

Background

Hull Kingston Rovers enter the 2012 season on the back of a good performance in 2011. They finished in 7th position on the competition table which qualified them for the playoffs before they were eliminated in the first rounds by the Catalans Dragons. However, Hull KR have lost much experience from their team over the off season. Key personnel losses included former coach Justin Morgan, who had helped Hull KR to get promoted to the Super League and the retirement of captain Mick Vella. Other key losses include Peter Fox, Clint Newton and Shaun Briscoe.

Craig Sandercock, who had been assistant at the Newcastle Knights was announced as the new coach in September 2011. Several players were signed to replace those who had left. These included former England player David Hodgson, Ryan O'Hara, Shannon McDonnell and Tongan international Mickey Paea. Injuries have also affected Hull KR with the loss of new captain Ben Galea and their 2011 player of the season Blake Green for much of the season.

Because of the loss of players, Hull Kingston Rovers prospects were not rated highly for 2012. Dave Woods, writer for the BBC said that " If they make the top eight, then you'd have to say "top achievement". But I reckon a year of relative struggle could be in store." They were given the 9th best odds to win the competition out of the 14 teams in the Super League.

2012 squad

2012 transfers

Ins

Outs

Season summary

February

Hull KR opened the season by losing 34–16 on the opening day of the season to last season's champions Leeds Rhinos. The scoreline flattered Leeds who were able to pull away in the last 15 minutes of the match. The first win of the season came the next week when they defeated Wakefield 22–10 away from home. However, the victory came at a cost with scrum half Michael Dobson suffering a shoulder injury.

Fixtures and results

References

External links
Official website
East Hull is Wonderful fanzine
Unofficial Hull KR fans internet forum
Hull KR Junior Robins

Hull Kingston Rovers seasons
Hull Kingston Rovers season